Dutcher is a surname. Notable people with the surname include:

 Adelaide Dutcher (fl. 1901), American physician and public health worker
 Jim Dutcher, American naturalist, cinematographer, director and author
 Jim Dutcher (basketball), former head basketball coach at the University of Minnesota
 John B. Dutcher (1830–1911), New York politician
 Judi Dutcher, American attorney and former politician 
 Richard Dutcher, American independent filmmaker
 Silas Belden Dutcher (1829–1909), New York politician

See also

References